Jan Dara may refer to:

 The Story of Jan Dara, a novel by Utsana Phloengtham; see Jan Dara the Beginning
 Jan Dara (2001 film), a Thai film adapted from the novel and directed by Nonzee Nimibutr
 Directed by Bhandevanov Devakula:
 Jan Dara the Beginning, a 2012 film 
 Jan Dara: The Finale, a 2013 film